Cek, also known as Jek or Dzhek, is a Northeast Caucasian language spoken by about 1,500 to 11,000 Jek people in the village of Jek in the mountains of northern Azerbaijan.

The Jek language is not a written language and Azeri serves as the literary language of the Jek, as well as all Shahdagh peoples.

References

External links 
Tərxan Paşazadə, "Dünyanın nadir etnik qrupu – Azərbaycan cekliləri", Azərbaycan qəzeti
Большая Энциклопедия в 62 томах: Джеки
Speech.

Jek (Quba)
Northeast Caucasian languages
Languages of Azerbaijan
Endangered Caucasian languages
Quba District (Azerbaijan)

ru:Джекский язык